The International Humanitarian Fact-Finding Commission (IHFFC) is an international body that is available to perform investigations of possible breaches of international humanitarian law. The Commission may investigate matters to determine what has happened, but does not pass judgment on issues it raises.

History 

IHFFC was established in 1991 and has its basis in the First Optional Protocol to the Geneva Conventions, agreed in 1977.

Operation 
The Swiss Ministry of Foreign Affairs carries out the secretariat functions. IHFFC is headquartered in Bern. 76 states have joined the body.

The organization has the status of a permanent observer in the UN General Assembly.

Activations 
Never in its history, has the commission been activated.<ref>[http://www.ihffc.org/Files/en/pdf/ihffc_report_2010_en.pdf Report on the work of the IHFFC on the Occasion of its 20th Anniversary '''], IHFFC, p. 5.</ref>

On 7 October 2015, Médecins Sans Frontières called for activating the Commission, to investigate the deadly U.S. bombing of MSF's hospital in Kunduz, Afghanistan. MSF says it does not trust internal military inquiries into the bombing that killed 42 people, which it considers a war crime. 

USA and Afghanistan are not among the 76 signatories of the IHFFC.

In 2016, Médecins Sans Frontières again called for the Commission activation, after the bombing of an MSF hospital in Yemen.

 Members of the Commission 
The Commission consists of fifteen experts. On 20 February 2017 they were:

 See also 

 Kunduz hospital airstrike
Airstrikes on hospitals in Yemen
 References 

 Bibliography 
 Frits Kalshoven: "The International Humanitarian Fact-Finding Commission: A Sleeping Beauty?" In: Humanitäres Völkerrecht - Informationsschriften. 4/2002. DRK-Generalsekretariat und Institut für Friedenssicherungsrecht und Humanitäres Völkerrecht, pp. 213–216, 
 Erich Kussbach: The International Humanitarian Fact-Finding Commission. In: International and Comparative Law Quarterly. 43(1)/1994. British Institute of International and Comparative Law, pp. 174–185, 
 Luigi Condorelli: The International Humanitarian Fact-Finding Commission. An Obsolete Tool or a Useful Measure to Implement International Humanitarian Law? In: International Review of the Red Cross. 842/2001. Internationales Komitee vom Roten Kreuz, pp. 393–406, 
 Charles Garrawaya: The International Humanitarian Fact‐Finding Commission. In: Commonwealth Law Bulletin.'' 34(4)/2008. Routledge on behalf of the Legal and Constitutional Affairs Division of the Commonwealth Secretariat, pp. 813–816,

External links 
 

International human rights organizations
Organizations established in 1991
Geneva Conventions
International organisations based in Switzerland